Replication protein A 14 kDa subunit is a protein that in humans is encoded by the RPA3 gene.

Interactions 
RPA3 has been shown to interact with replication protein A1 and replication protein A2.

See also
 Single-stranded binding protein
 Replication protein A
 Replication protein A1
 Replication protein A2

References

Further reading